Crioceris, or asparagus beetle, is a genus of the family Chrysomelidae of beetles.
 Not all species in the genus Crioceris feed on asparagus (e.g., C. nigropicta). Some studies have found low genetic diversity among groups of isolated Chrysomelidae, and use Wolbachia species as a genetic marker.

Species
Crioceris asparagi (Linnaeus, 1758), common asparagus beetle
Crioceris bicruciata (Sahlberg, 1823)
Crioceris duodecimpunctata (Linnaeus, 1758), spotted asparagus beetle
Crioceris macilenta Weise, 1880
Crioceris nigropunctata Lacordaire, 1845
Crioceris paracenthesis (Linnaeus, 1767)
Crioceris quatuordecimpunctata (Scopoli, 1763)
Crioceris quinquepunctata (Scopoli, 1763)

References

Criocerinae
Chrysomelidae genera
Taxa named by Étienne Louis Geoffroy